New Zealand had seven competitors (five men and two women) at the 1968 Winter Olympics in Grenoble, France. All took part in the Alpine Skiing events; the highest finish by a New Zealand competitor was 30th place by Anne Reid in the Ladies Slalom.

Alpine skiing

Men

Men's slalom

Women

References
Official Olympic Report (PDF)
 Olympic Winter Games 1968, full results by sports-reference.com

Nations at the 1968 Winter Olympics
1968
Winter Olympics